The following is a list of episodes of Wait Wait... Don't Tell Me!, NPR's news panel game, during 2012.  Job titles and lines of work reflect the position of individuals at the time of the appearance.  All shows, unless otherwise indicated, are hosted by Peter Sagal with announcer/scorekeeper Carl Kassel, and originated at Chicago's Chase Auditorium.



January

February

March

April

May

June

July

August

September

October

November

December

References 

Wait Wait... Don't Tell Me!
Wait Wait Don't Tell Me
Wait Wait Don't Tell Me